Shoal Creek may refer to:

 Shoal Creek (Soque River), in the U.S. state of Georgia
 Shoal Creek (Illinois), a tributary of the Kaskaskia River
 Shoal Creek (Spring River), in Missouri and Kansas
 Shoal Creek (Chariton River), in Missouri
 Shoal Creek (Grand River), in Missouri
 Shoal Creek (Huzzah Creek), in Missouri
 Shoal Creek (North Carolina), including Eastatoe Falls in Transylvania County, North Carolina
 Shoal Creek (Tennessee River), a tributary of the Tennessee River
Tributaries of Shoal Creek, including East Fork Shoal Creek and Little Shoal Creek
Shoal Creek in Scott County, Tennessee, a tributary of the New River
Shoal Creek in Fentress County, Tennessee, a tributary of the Clear Fork River
Shoal Creek in Cumberland County, Tennessee, a tributary of the Obed River
 Shoal Creek, Austin, Texas

See also
 Shoal Creek Golf and Country Club, in Alabama
 Shoal Creek Drive, Missouri, a village in Newton County
 Shoal Creek Estates, Missouri, a village in Newton County
 Shoal Creek Living History Museum, a museum in Kansas City, Missouri